Italy–Uruguay relations refers to the current and historical relations between Italy and Uruguay. Both nations enjoy friendly relations, the importance of which centers on the history of Italian migration to Uruguay. Approximately 40% of the Uruguayan population is of Italian origin. Both nations are members of the United Nations.

History
In 1828, Uruguay obtained its independence after the Cisplatine War. In 1834, the Kingdom of Sardinia opened a consular agency in Montevideo, followed by the Grand Duchy of Tuscany and the Papal States. In 1842, Italian General (and future unifier of Italy) Giuseppe Garibaldi, fought for Uruguayan rebels during the Uruguayan Civil War against the Argentine Confederation and Uruguayan Nationalist Party.

In 1843, both nations signed a Treaty of Friendship, Commerce and Navigation. Between 1879 and 1930, over 90,000 Italians migrated to Uruguay. In 1924, Italian Prince Umberto of Piedmont (future King Umberto II) visited Uruguay. The Prince's main visit to Uruguay (and other South American nations) was part of a political plan of fascism to link the Italian people living outside of Italy with their mother country. In January 1942, during World War II, Uruguay declared war on the Axis powers (which included Italy). In April 1946, both nations re-established diplomatic relations.

Due to the fact that almost half of Uruguays population is of Italian descent, relations between both nations have remained close, both politically and culturally. There have been several high-level visits between leaders of both nations. In October 2005, Uruguayan President Tabaré Vázquez paid a visit to Italy. In March 2017, Italian President Sergio Mattarella paid a visit to Uruguay.

In 2019, 125,000 people in Uruguay held Italian passports, many being dual Italian and Uruguayan citizens.

Bilateral agreements

Both nations have signed several agreements such as a Treaty of Friendship, Commerce and Navigation (1843); Extradition Treaty (1881); Agreement on the Transportation of Cattle between both nations (1976); Agreement on Social Security (1985); Agreement on Technical Cooperation (1988); Agreement on the Promotion and Protection of Investments (1990); Agreement on Cinematographic Co-Production (2004); Agreement on Defense Cooperation (2017); Agreement in Judicial Matters (2019); Agreement to Eliminate Double Taxation in Relation to Income Taxes and Prevent Tax Evasion and Avoidance (2019) and an Agreement on Cultural and Scientific cooperation (2019).

Resident diplomatic missions
 Italy has an embassy in Montevideo.
 Uruguay has an embassy in Rome and a consulate-general in Milan.

See also
 Italian Uruguayans
 Uruguayans in Italy

References 

 
Uruguay
Italy